Armstead Milton Alexander (May 26, 1834 – November 7, 1892) was a slave owner and lawyer who served as a member of the United States House of Representatives from Missouri.

He was born in Winchester, Kentucky, and later graduated from Bethany College.  Around 1848, he moved to the Paris, Missouri, area to become a blacksmith.  In 1849, he joined the California gold rush, returning later to Paris, Missouri, to engage in business.  During the American Civil War, he sided with the Confederacy, and served in the Confederate States Army.

In 1870, he was admitted to the bar of Missouri, and starting practicing in the Paris area, although he did not sign the record there until 1881.  During this time, he served as prosecuting attorney for Monroe County from 1872 through 1876, and was a delegate to the Missouri Constitutional Convention in 1875.

He was elected to the United States House of Representatives in 1883, and served there through 1885.  He returned to Paris, Missouri, and died there in 1892.

References

 Who Was Who in America, Historical Volume, 1607-1896. Chicago: Marquis Who's Who, 1967.

1834 births
1892 deaths
People from Winchester, Kentucky
Democratic Party members of the United States House of Representatives from Missouri
American prosecutors
Missouri lawyers
American slave owners
People of the California Gold Rush
People from Paris, Missouri
19th-century American politicians
19th-century American lawyers
Bethany College (West Virginia) alumni
Confederate States Army soldiers
People of Missouri in the American Civil War